The Jebiwool Art Museum is an art museum in Galhyeon-dong, Gwacheon, Gyeonggi Province, South Korea.

See also
List of museums in South Korea

External links

Art museums and galleries in South Korea
Museums in Gyeonggi Province
Buildings and structures in Gwacheon